Tiruchirappalli is a city in the Indian state of Tamil Nadu. It is the fourth most populous city and is the densest regional urban area in the state. According to the 2001 census, Tiruchirappalli had a population of 752,066 with in the city limits and an extended urban agglomeration population of 866,354. According to the 2011 provisional population totals, the city has a population of 846,915 while the regional urban area has 1,021,717 residents. The city's sex ratio of 1025 is among the best for any city in India which has a population of one million or more.

The most widely spoken language is Tamil followed by Telugu, Saurashtra and Kannada.

History of enumeration 

According to the 1871 Indian census, the first in British India, Tiruchirappalli had a population of 76,530 making it the second largest city in Madras Presidency, next only to the capital city of Madras. The population grew further by 10.3% and 7.3% over the next two decades respectively, thus reaching 0.1 million in 1901. Tiruchirappalli along with Madras and Madurai were the three cities with a population of 0.1 million or more at the time. The city experienced a negative growth rate during the decade 1911—21. After that it grew steadily and attained a growth rate of 37.2% during 1941—51. During the 1970s, it fell behind other cities such as Madurai and Coimbatore. As of 2011, it is the fourth largest city in Tamil Nadu after Chennai, Coimbatore and Madurai. The concept of urban agglomeration (UA) was introduced in the 1991 census. The UA had a population of 711,862. After the city was made a Municipal corporation in 1994 by annexing Srirangam and Golden Rock municipalities, its population almost doubled in 2001.

Religions 
The majority of the population of Tiruchirappalli follow Hinduism. There is a considerable population that follow Islam and Christianity. Sikhs and Jains also form a small amount of the total population. Tamil, the official language of the state is the most commonly used language, followed by Telugu, Saurashtra and Kannada Unlike other regions of Tamil Nadu, the people of Tiruchirappalli follow the standard dialect of Tamil, the Central Tamil dialect. Saurashtra is the mother tongue of the Saurashtrians who migrated from southern Gujarat to South India in 14th century AD. There is also a substantial population of Sri Lankan Tamil migrants, most of whom are housed in refugee camps on the outskirts of the city. Roman Catholics in Tiruchirappalli are affiliated to the Roman Catholic Diocese of Tiruchirapalli while Protestants are affiliated to the Trichy–Tanjore Diocese of the Church of South India. As a separate division of the Southern Railway is headquartered at Tiruchirappalli city, there is a considerably strong Anglo-Indian population in the city.

Notes 

T
Tiruchirappalli

References